The Argentina national beach handball team is the national team of Argentina. It is governed by the Argentinean Handball Confederation and takes part in international beach handball competitions.

Competition results

World Championships
2014 – 10th place
2018 – 11th place
2022 – 11th place

World Games
2022 – 5th place

Other competitions
2019 South American Beach Games - 5th place
2019 South and Central American Beach Handball Championship - 
2022 South and Central American Beach Handball Championship -

Youth team results
2018 Summer Youth Olympics - 
2017 Youth Beach Handball World Championship - 
2022 Youth Beach Handball World Championship - 5th
2017 Pan American Youth Beach Handball Championship - 
2022 South and Central American Youth Beach Handball Championship - 
2022 South American Youth Games -

References

External links
Official website
IHF profile

https://www.instagram.com/beachhandball.arg/

Beach handball
National beach handball teams
Beach handball